Difluorodiphenyltrichloroethane (DFDT) is a chemical compound. Its composition is the same as that of the insecticide DDT, except that two of DDT's chlorine atoms are replaced by two fluorine atoms.

DFDT was developed as an insecticide by German scientists during World War II, partly to avoid having to pay license fees for DDT. It was documented by Allied military intelligence, but remained in obscurity after the war. 

In 2019, New York University chemists reported that DFDT and a mono-fluorinated derivative, MFDT, might be a more effective insecticide than DDT, and might therefore be used to combat malaria with less of an environmental impact. A later study, however, found that "DFDT is unlikely to be a viable public health vector control insecticide".

References

DDT
Fluoroarenes
Endocrine disruptors
Organochloride insecticides
Trichloromethyl compounds